Sukit Chitranukhroh (1928 – November 2007) was a Thai footballer. He competed in the men's tournament at the 1956 Summer Olympics.

References

External links
 

1928 births
2007 deaths
Sukit Chitranukhroh
Sukit Chitranukhroh
Sukit Chitranukhroh
Footballers at the 1956 Summer Olympics
Sukit Chitranukhroh
Association football forwards